Zdeněk Skořepa (born August 10, 1976 in Duchcov) is a Czech professional ice hockey player. He was selected by the New Jersey Devils in the 4th round (103rd overall) of the 1994 NHL Entry Draft and played for Kingston Frontenacs, Albany River Rats, Detroit Vipers, 1994–1998, but then returned to the Czech republic to play 1999 onwards for various Czech teams. In the 2011-2012 season he played with SK Kadaň.

References

External links

1976 births
Czech ice hockey forwards
HC Slavia Praha players
Living people
New Jersey Devils draft picks
People from Duchcov
Sportspeople from the Ústí nad Labem Region
Czech expatriate ice hockey players in Canada
Czech expatriate ice hockey players in the United States
Czech expatriate ice hockey players in Russia